The 1994–95 FIBA Korać Cup was the 24th edition of FIBA's Korać Cup basketball competition. The German Alba Berlin defeated the Italian Stefanel Milano in the final. This was the first time a German team won the title.

Team allocation 
The labels in the parentheses show how each team qualified for the place of its starting round:

 1st, 2nd, 3rd, etc.: League position after Playoffs
 WC: Wild card

First round

|}

Second round

|}

Qualified directly to the next round:

  Stefanel Milano
  Pau-Orthez

Round of 32

|}

Round of 16

Group A

Group B

Group C

Group D

Quarterfinals

|}

Semifinals

|}

Finals

|}

See also 

 1994–95 Euroleague
 1994–95 FIBA European Cup

External links
 1994–95 FIBA Korać Cup @ linguasport.com

1994–95
1994–95 in European basketball